The first season of Food Paradise, an American food reality television series narrated by Mason Pettit on the Travel Channel, premiered on December 17, 2007. First-run episodes of the series aired in the United States on the Travel Channel on Mondays at 10:00 p.m. EDT. The season contained 15 episodes and concluded airing on April 26, 2008.

Food Paradise features the best places to find various cuisines at food locations across America. Each episode focuses on a certain type of restaurant, such as "Diners", "Bars", "Drive-Thrus" or "Breakfast" places that people go to find a certain food specialty.

Episodes

Hamburger Paradise

Pizza Paradise

Hot Dog Paradise

Steak Paradise

Donut Paradise

Barbecue Paradise

Ice Cream Paradise

Diner Paradise

All You Can Eat Paradise

Sandwich Paradise

Ribs Paradise

Steak Paradise 2: A Second Helping

Bar Food Paradise

Breakfast Paradise

Deep Fried Paradise

References

External links
Food Paradise @Travelchannel.com

2007 American television seasons
2008 American television seasons